The term TTV may refer to:

 Twitch.tv, a live video streaming platform
 T. T. V. Dhinakaran Indian politician and General Secretary of Amma Makkal Munnettra Kazagam              
 Taiwan Television
 TTV Main Channel
 TTV Family
 TTV Finance
 TTV Health
 TTV World
 TTV (Poland), a Polish television channel
 TechTV
 Tallinna TV
 "TTV", the second track on the 2001 album Fahrenheit Fair Enough by Telefon Tel Aviv
 Through the Viewfinder photography
 Time to value
 Transfusion Transmitted Virus or Torque teno virus
 Transit Timing Variation, a method for detecting exoplanets
 True the Vote, a US non-profit vote-monitoring organization